The Eastern Ridges and Lowlands is a geographical region in the eastern part of the U.S. state of Wisconsin, between Green Bay in the north, and the border with Illinois in the south. Lake Michigan lies to the east of the region.

The Eastern Ridges and Lowlands region is primarily a plain with elevations between 700 and 900 feet above sea level, but the region slopes to form two broad ridges running from north to south that exceed 1,000 feet above sea level in some places. One ridge runs along Lake Michigan from the Door Peninsula to the Illinois border. The other ridge is on the western edge of the region, stretching from Marinette County in the north to Dane County. Between the two ridges is a lowland carved out by the glaciers of the last ice age. The lowland includes the Green Bay, Lake Winnebago, and several other small rivers and lakes. While there are some escarpments along the ridges, the region is primarily flat and the changes in elevation are usually gradual. The flatness of the Eastern Ridges and Lowlands region makes it especially suitable for agriculture. The majority of the region is covered by farmland. Forests are scarce except for in the far northern part of the region. Besides farmland, the area includes a significant amount of urban and suburban development, and a large proportion of Wisconsin's population. Many of Wisconsin's largest cities are located in the Eastern Ridges and Lowlands region, including Milwaukee, Madison, Green Bay, Kenosha, Racine, Appleton, Sheboygan, and others. The abundance of cities in the area make it Wisconsin's most populous region. The largest city in this region is Milwaukee with a population of 592,025 (2018).

Counties and Cities in the Eastern Ridges and Lowlands region
Part or all of the land in the following counties is included in the Eastern Ridges and Lowlands region:
Brown County
Calumet County
Columbia County
Dane County
Dodge County
Door County
Fond du Lac County
Green Lake County
Jefferson County
Kenosha County
Kewaunee County
Manitowoc County
Marinette County
Milwaukee County
Oconto County
Outagamie County
Ozaukee County
Racine County
Rock County
Shawano County
Sheboygan County
Walworth County
Washington County
Waukesha County
Winnebago County

Selected Cities in Eastern Ridges and Lowlands region

In Southeastern and South Central Wisconsin 
 Milwaukee
 Waukesha
 Madison
 Janesville
 Port Washington
 Kenosha

In Northeastern and East Central Wisconsin 
 Green Bay
 Appleton
 Oshkosh
 Fond du Lac
 Manitowoc
 Sturgeon Bay

References

Regions of Wisconsin